The Denmark men's national volleyball team represents Denmark in international men's volleyball competitions and friendly matches.

Results

European Championship
2013 – 12th place

European League
2014 – 10th place
2015 – 7th place
2016 – 5th place
2017 – 4th place

External links
Official website
FIVB profile

National men's volleyball teams
Volleyball men
Volleyball in Denmark
Men's sport in Denmark